During the British Raj period, Lakhtar State, in the present-day Indian state of Gujarat, was a non-salute princely state and was governed by members of a Jhala rajput dynasty.

Lakhtar state was founded in 1604. The rulers ruled with the title of Thakur Sahib.

Ruler 
 1 Thakur Abhaisinhji Chandrasinhji 1604 – 1639
 2 Thakur Vajirajji Abhaisinhji 1639 – 1665
 3 Thakur Sahib Sheshmalji Vajerajji 1665 – 1696
 4 Thakur Sahib Gopalsinhji Sheshmalji 1696 – 1714
 5 Thakur Sahib Karansinhji I Gopalsinhji 1714 – 1741
 6 Thakur Sahib Abherajji Karansinhji 1741 – 1769
 7 Thakur Sahib Raydhanji Abherajji 1769 – 1798
 8 Thakur Sahib Sangramji Raydhanji 1798 (Abdicated)
 9 Thakur Sahib Chandrasinhji Raydhanji (Brother) 1798 – 1803
 10 Thakur Sahib Prithirajji Chandrasinhji 1803 – 1835
 11 Thakur Sahib Vajirajji II Prithirajji 1835 – 12 June 1846
 12 June 1846 – 8 August 1924  Karansinhji II Vajirajji (1846 – 1924)
 13 8 August 1924 – 2 July 1940  Balvirsinhji Karansinhji
 14 2 July 1940 – 15 Aug 1947  Indrasinhji Balvirsinhji (1907 – 1990s)

References 

Princely states of Gujarat
1604 establishments in India
Taluka of Surendranagar